The 2009–10 GET-ligaen was the 71st season of Norway's premier ice hockey league, Eliteserien (known as GET-ligaen for sponsorship reasons). The regular season began play on 12 September 2009 and concluded on 2 March 2010, with Vålerenga claiming their twenty-seventh League Championship after defeating Lillehammer 2–1 on 26 February. Vålerenga won the league twelve points ahead of the Sparta Warriors, who were defending champions. The league was contested by ten teams until Comet folded in October 2009, leaving nine teams to finish the regular season.

The playoffs to determine the 2010 Norwegian Ice Hockey Champions began on 4 March and ended on 19 April 2010. The Stavanger Oilers defeated Vålerenga by 4 games to 2 in the Final to win their first ever title.

Regular season
In June 2009, the Norwegian Ice Hockey Association (NIHF) denied Comet entry into the league for the 2009–10 season due to the club's poor financial situation. This decision was subsequently reversed after an appeal by Comet. Less than two months later and shortly before the start of the season, the tax authorities in Halden successfully filed a bankruptcy claim against the club, the result being that they went into administration on 4 September. Comet had managed to pay roughly 1.1 million of the 2 million kroner they owed to the tax authorities at that point, but the district court felt that the club were unable to guarantee that the remaining debts would be paid off. Nonetheless, the administrator in charge of the bankruptcy suggested that there was a possibility of Comet being rescued, and the NIHF reaffirmed, amid protests from the other nine clubs, that Comet would be allowed to play in the top flight.

The possibility of coming out of administration rested on Comet's ability to earn income from home games, but due to an ongoing redevelopment of their home arena, the municipally owned Halden Ishall, the club were forced to play all their fixtures in September as away games. When an application for use of the arena as of October was denied because the building did not yet meet the fire safety code, the administrator declared on 2 October that the running of the club would have to discontinue. A last-ditch attempt by a group of local investors to save the club could not remedy the fact that Halden Ishall remained unavailable, and Comet folded on 6 October. This was the third bankruptcy in Norwegian top tier ice hockey in three years. All results involving Comet were annulled and a sixth round robin was introduced, bringing the total number of games per team up to 48.

Two clubs were penalized over the course of the season for using ineligible players. The Frisk Tigers were found to have fielded four such players during their opening match loss to the Stavanger Oilers on 12 September. For this, the NIHF issued a fine of 6,000 kroner and had the result of the game changed from 4–2 to 5–0 in favour of the Oilers. On 25 November, the Storhamar Dragons were found to have used an ineligible player during three games played  that month, and were consequently handed a fine of 4,500 kroner. Again, the result of each match was set to 5–0 in favour of the opposing team. Two of the three teams, the Frisk Tigers and Stavanger Oilers,  were thus awarded an extra three and two points respectively compared to their original results against the Dragons, while Stjernen received no extra points as they had already won their match.

Final standings

GP = Games played; W = Wins; L = Losses; OTW = Overtime Wins; OTL = Overtime losses; SOW = Shootout Wins; SOL = Shootout losses; PCT = Percent of possible points; GF = Goals for; GA = Goals against; PIM = Penalties in minutes; Pts = Points; C = ChampionsSource: pointstreak.com

Statistics

Scoring leaders
These are the top ten skaters based on points. If the list exceeds ten skaters because of a tie in points, all of the tied skaters are shown.
GP = Games played; G = Goals; A = Assists; Pts = Points; +/– = Plus/minus; PIM = Penalty minutes

Leading goaltenders
These are the top five goaltenders based on goals against average.
GP = Games played; TOI = Time on ice (minutes); W = Wins; L = Losses; GA = Goals against; SO = Shutouts; Sv% = Save percentage; GAA = Goals against average

Attendance

For the 2009–10 season, the league attendance totaled 317,283 spectators for an average of 1,486. This was a 2.6% increase from the previous season's total of 309,332 spectators, and a rise of 6.8% in average attendance compared with the previous seasons's average of 1,374. The league recorded the highest average attendance since the 1992–93 season, which saw an average of 1,623 spectators during the second half of the Eliteserien (between the 1990–91 and 1993–94 season, the league was contested as two separate halves). It was also the first time since the 1994–95 season that attendance had averaged more than 1,400. Attendances rose for the fifth consecutive season.

Playoffs
After the regular season, the standard of eight teams qualified for the playoffs. In the first and second rounds, the highest remaining seed chose which of the two lowest remaining seeds to be matched against. In each round the higher-seeded team was awarded home ice advantage. Each best-of-seven series followed a 1–1–1–1–1–1–1 format: the higher-seeded team played at home for games 1 and 3 (plus 5 and 7 if necessary), and the lower-seeded team at home for games 2, 4 and 6 (if necessary).

The Final was contested between Vålerenga and the Stavanger Oilers. Vålerenga defeated Manglerud Star and the Storhamar Dragons to advance to the Final; Stavanger defeated Lørenskog and the Sparta Warriors. This was the second time the two teams had met in a final, the first being in 2006 when Vålerenga won their twenty-fourth Norwegian Championship, sweeping the Oilers 4–0 in the best-of-seven series. On this occasion, however, the Oilers defeated Vålerenga 4–2 to claim their first ever title, in the process also becoming the first club outside the traditional hockey powerhouse of Eastern Norway to win the championship.

Vålerenga, as league champions, were seeded first and enjoyed home ice advantage. They took a 1–0 lead in the series by winning the opening match at Jordal Amfi 5–4 in overtime. The hosts held the lead three times, before Stavanger staged a turnaround to 4–3 in the third period. With the score eventually tied at 4–4, the game went into overtime and was decided when Vålerenga and Mathias Trygg got the upper hand in a power play. Despite calls for interference, the goal was allowed. Stavanger responded by winning 4–3 at home in game 2, before being soundly beaten 0–5 in game 3.

The fourth game was the most closely contested in the series, being tied at 1–1 in regulation and won by the Oilers in double overtime. Nearly halfway into the first period of overtime, a breakaway goal by Stavanger's Juha Kaunismäki was controversially disallowed because none of the officials, including the goal judge, saw the puck go in. Footage provided by the broadcaster TV 2 showed the puck deflecting off the right post, the net inside the goal and finally the left post before being blocked by the goaltender. Since video refereeing is not allowed in Norwegian ice hockey, the footage could not be used and the game continued until Snorre Hallem scored 4 minutes and 38 seconds into the second overtime period to tie the series at 2–2. Following this incident, the NIHF decided to allow limited use of video replays for the remainder of the series, and will also consider the possibility of implementing video refereeing on a broader scale in the next season.

Game 5 became a turning point as Stavanger, needing to win at least once in Oslo, came back from a 0–2 deficit to tie the game with 23 seconds remaining on the clock, and then claim victory in overtime. Yet again, there were allegations of foul play, this time coming from Vålerenga, as Christian Dahl Andersen had scored the equalizer with his skate. However, the match officials agreed with Dahl Andersen that the skate was not actively used to score the goal. The result put the Oilers ahead 3–2 in the series, setting the stage for a possible championship deciding win at home in Stavanger. Indeed, in front of a packed audience in the Siddishallen, they defeated Vålerenga 4–0 to clinch the title.

Bracket

Source: pointstreak.com

Game log

|(1) Vålerenga vs. (7) Manglerud Star

Vålerenga won series 4–1

(2) Sparta Warriors vs. (6) Stjernen

Sparta won series 4–2

(3) Stavanger Oilers vs. (5) Lillehammer

Stavanger won series 4–2

(4) Lørenskog vs. (8) Storhamar Dragons

Storhamar won series 4–1

|(1) Vålerenga vs. (8) Storhamar Dragons

Vålerenga won series 4–1

(2) Sparta Warriors vs. (3) Stavangers Oilers

Stavanger won series 4–2

|(1) Vålerenga vs. (3) Stavanger Oilers

Stavanger won series 4–2

Statistics

Scoring leaders
These are the top ten skaters in the playoffs based on points. If the list exceeds ten skaters because of a tie in points, all of the tied skaters are shown.
GP = Games played; G = Goals; A = Assists; Pts = Points; +/– = Plus/minus; PIM = Penalty minutes

Leading goaltenders
These are the top five goaltenders in the playoffs based on goals against average.
GP = Games played; TOI = Time on ice (minutes); W = Wins; L = Losses; GA = Goals against; SO = Shutouts; Sv% = Save percentage; GAA = Goals against average

Qualifying for GET-ligaen 2010–11

Final standings

GP = Games played; W = Wins; L = Losses; OTW = Overtime Wins; OTL = Overtime losses; SOW = Shootout Wins; SOL = Shootout losses; PCT = Percentage of possible points; GF = Goals for; GA = Goals against; PIM = Penalties in minutes; Pts = Points; Q = QualifiedSource: hockey.no

Game log

|Round 1

Round 2

Round 3

Round 4

Round 5

Round 6

Awards
All-Star team

The following players were selected to the 2009–10 GET-ligaen All-Star team:
Goaltender: Patrick DesRochers (Vålerenga)
Defenseman: Robert Bina (Stavanger)
Defenseman: Regan Kelly (Vålerenga)
Center: Anders Fredriksen (Vålerenga)
Winger: Tomi Pöllänen (Lillehammer)
Winger: Knut Henrik Spets (Vålerenga)

Other
Player of the year: Tomi Pöllänen (Lillehammer)
Coach of the year: David Livingston (Manglerud Star)
Playoff MVP: Robert Bina (Stavanger)

References

External links
  

 
2009-10
nor
GET